The 2014 SWF Scottish Cup is the national cup competition in Scottish women's football. All teams in the Scottish Women's Football League and Premier League are eligible to enter. 67 teams entered the cup, Premier League sides only enter the second round.

Preliminary round
Draw was between 55 teams, 30 teams drawn to play in the preliminary round, 25 teams drew a bye to the first round. Played 20 April 2014.

First round
15 winners from the preliminary round joined 25 teams with a bye. Played 18 May 2014, with Celtic 20s postponed to 28 May 14.

Second round
20 winners from the first round join the twelve Scottish Women's Premier League teams that enter this round. Played 22 June 2014.

Third round
Played on 17 August 2014.

Quarter-finals
Falkirk is the only non-Premier League team remaining. Played 28 September 2014.

Semi-finals
Only Premier League teams remain. Played on 19 October 2014.

Final
Holders Glasgow City won the third national treble in a row.

References

External links
 Scottish Women's Football

Scottish Women's Cup
2014 in Scottish women's football
2014 domestic association football cups